Dawid Tomasz Woch (born 16 May 1997) is a Polish volleyball player. At the professional club level, he plays for BBTS Bielsko-Biała.

Career
On April 12, 2015 Poland men's national under-19 volleyball team, including Woch, won title of U19 European Champion 2015. They beat in final Italy U19 (3–1). He took part in European Youth Olympic Festival with Polish national U19 team. On August 1, 2015 he achieved gold medal (final match with Bulgaria 3–0). On August 23, 2015 Poland achieved first title of U19 World Champion. In the finale his team beat hosts - Argentina (3–2). On September 10, 2016 he achieved title of the 2016 CEV U20 European Champion after winning 7 of 7 matches in tournament and beating Ukraine U21 in the final (3–1).

He debuted in 2016–17 PlusLiga as a player of MKS Będzin. In November 2017 he signed 7 months contract with French club Nice VB.

Honours

Youth national team
 2015  CEV U19 European Championship
 2015  European Youth Olympic Festival
 2015  FIVB U19 World Championship
 2016  CEV U20 European Championship

References

External links
 
 Player profile at PlusLiga.pl 
 Player profile at Volleybox.net

1997 births
Living people
Sportspeople from Częstochowa
Polish men's volleyball players
Polish expatriate sportspeople in France
Expatriate volleyball players in France
MKS Będzin players
GKS Katowice (volleyball) players
BKS Visła Bydgoszcz players
AZS Olsztyn players
Gwardia Wrocław players
BBTS Bielsko-Biała players
Middle blockers